Chicken feet are cooked and eaten in many countries.  After an outer layer of hard skin is removed, most of the edible tissue on the feet consists of skin and tendons, with no muscle. This gives the feet a distinct gelatinous texture different from the rest of the chicken meat.

Around the world

China 

Chicken feet are used in several regional Chinese cuisines; they can be served as a beer snack, cold dish, soup or main dish. They are interchangeably called Fèng zhuǎ (鳯爪, phoenix claws), Jī zhuǎ (鷄爪, chicken claws), and Jī jiǎo (雞脚, chicken feet).

In Guangdong and Hong Kong, they are typically deep fried and steamed first to make them puffy before being stewed and simmered in a sauce flavoured with black fermented beans, bean paste, and sugar; or in abalone sauce.

In mainland China, popular snack bars specializing in marinated food such as yabozi (duck's necks) also sell lu ji zhua (鹵雞爪, marinated chicken feet), which are simmered with soy sauce, Sichuanese peppercorn, clove, garlic, star anise, cinnamon and chili flakes. Today, packaged chicken feet are sold in most grocery stores and supermarkets in China as a snack, often seasoned with rice vinegar and chili. Another popular recipe is bai yun feng zhao, which is marinated in a sauce of rice vinegar, rice wine flavored with sugar, salt, and minced ginger for an extended period of time and served as a cold dish. In southern China, they also cook chicken feet with raw peanuts to make a thin soup.

The huge demand in China raises the price of chicken feet, which are often used as fodder in other countries. As of June 2011, 1 kg of raw chicken feet costs around 12 to 16 yuan in China, compared to 11–12 yuan for 1 kg of frozen chicken breast. In 2000, Hong Kong, once the largest entrepôt for shipping chicken feet from over 30 countries, traded a total of 420,000 tons of chicken feet at the value of US$230 million. Two years after joining the WTO in 2001, China approved the direct import of American chicken feet, and since then China has been the major destination of chicken feet from around the globe.

Aside from chicken feet, duck feet are also popular. Duck feet with mustard, which is often served with vinegar, fresh green pepper and crushed garlic, is a popular salad/appetizer.

Eastern Europe 

In Russia, Ukraine, Romania, and Moldova, chicken feet are cleaned, seasoned, and boiled, often with vegetables, and then cooled, to make an aspic called kholodets in Russian and Ukrainian, and piftie or răcitură in Romanian. The legs are not always eaten, however the chicken is cooked with its legs, as they contain a high amount of gelatin.

Indonesia 
In Indonesian cuisine, chicken feet are known as ceker, and it is a common popular delicacy in Indonesia, especially in Java. The most common way to serve chicken feet in Indonesia is in spicy traditional soup called soto, nevertheless, the Chinese style dimsum chicken feet is also available in some Chinese restaurants in Indonesia. Soto ceker is chicken foot served in rather clear yellowish spicy soto broth soup, which uses spices including ground shallot, garlic, galangal, ginger, candlenut, bruised lemongrass, daun salam (Indonesian bayleaf) and turmeric that add the yellowish color, served with cabbage, celery, rice noodles, and garnished to taste with sambal, lime and soy.

Soto ceker is one of the popular street food in Jakarta, Bali, Surabaya, Bandung, and most of major cities in Indonesia. In street side warung or humble restaurants, soto ceker is usually offered as a variation of popular soto ayam (chicken soto), which employ the identical soup base with chicken soto. A popular soto ceker stall such as Soto Ceker Pak Ali in Gandaria street, South Jakarta, can use up to 40 kilograms of chicken feet every day, although the stall is only open from 4 p.m. to 11 p.m., and can reap Rp 5 million (US$360) in sales each day.

Another popular way to prepare chicken feet is serving it in simple soup (sop or sup) called sop ceker, which mainly contains chicken broth, chicken feet, vegetables especially potato and carrot, shallot, garlic and black pepper. The deep fried peeled chicken feet, which has been separated from its bones, might be served as a crispy snack treat as kripik ceker (chicken feet crackers).

In Indonesia, the soft peeled boneless chicken feet are a popular choice for baby food — given to babies between 6–12 months old. It often served as nasi tim: steamed rice with boneless chicken feet, mashed liver and vegetable broth. Chicken feet which consists of tendons, skin and cartilage, is rich in gelatinous collagen, and is traditionally believed to be beneficial for infants' skin, nails, joints and bone development.

Jamaica 
In Jamaican cuisine, chicken feet are mainly used to make chicken foot soup. The soup contains yams, potatoes, green banana, dumplings and special spices in addition to the chicken feet, and is slow cooked for a minimum of two hours. Chicken feet are also curried or stewed and served as a main part of a meal.

Korea 

In Korea, chicken feet are known as dakbal, and grilled or stir-fried with hot chili sauce. There are many types of cooking methods, including bone-free, cooked with soup and so on. They are often eaten as anju (food served with alcohol).

Kosher 
Chicken feet are commonly used as a main or supplementary ingredient in kosher chicken soup.

Malaysia 
Chicken feet are also known as ceker in Malaysia and are traditionally popular mostly among Malays of Javanese, Chinese, and Siamese descent.  Many traditional Malay restaurants in the state of Johor offer chicken feet that are cooked together with Malay-style curry and eaten with roti canai. In the state of Selangor, chicken feet are either boiled in soup until the bones are soft with vegetables and spices or deep fried in palm oil. Chicken feet are also eaten by Malaysian Chinese in traditional Chinese cooking style.

Mexico 
Chicken feet (also known as “patitas”) are a popular ingredient across Mexico, particularly in stews and soups. They are often steamed to become part of a main dish with rice, vegetables and most likely another part of the chicken, such as the breast or thighs. The feet can be seasoned with mole sauce. On occasion, they are breaded and fried.

Many people will also take the chicken feet in hand as a snack and chew the soft outer skin. The inner bone structure is left uneaten another such popular snack are chicken necks (also known as "pescuezos") that are usually sold by street vendors and accompanied with salsa Valentina (hot sauce).

Philippines 
In the Philippines, chicken feet are marinated in a mixture of calamansi, spices and brown sugar before being grilled. A popular staple in Philippine street food, chicken feet are commonly known as "adidas" (named after the athletic shoe brand Adidas).Chicken feet is also an ingredient in Philippine adobo.

South Africa 
In South Africa, chicken feet are mainly eaten in townships in all nine provinces, where they are known as "walkie talkies" (together with the head, intestine, hearts and giblets), "runaways","chicken dust" and "Amanqina" (in isiXhosa)  The feet are submerged in hot water, so the outer layer of the skin can be removed by peeling it off, and then covered in seasonings and grilled. The name "chicken dust" derives from the dust chickens create when scratching the ground with their feet. They are often eaten as a snack.

Thailand 

In Thai cuisine, the chicken feet are served in a variety of dishes, such as in a version of chicken green curry.

Trinidad 
In Trinidad, the chicken feet are cleaned, seasoned, boiled in seasoned water, and left to soak with cucumbers, onions, peppers and green seasoning until cool. It is eaten as a party dish called chicken foot souse.

See also
List of chicken dishes

References

External links

 
 

Dim sum
Offal
World cuisine
Food ingredients
Chicken as food
Mexican cuisine